Catuquinarú is the extinct and unclassified language of the Catuquinaru tribe of Brazil, preserved in a few words collected by Jose Bach and published by G. E. Church in 1898. The name is a common derivative of Catuquina. Loukotka includes it among the Tupi languages, describing the people as Tupinized Catuquina. However, the little preserved vocabulary does not resemble that of the Tupi languages, Catuquinan languages, or Panoan languages (compare Panoan Catuquina).

The following words are given by Loukotka: 
taka-su 'head'
saña 'tooth'
punü 'hand'
uhehü 'water'

Bach reported that the Catuquinaru used a coded version of their language to communicate over distances of up to 1.5 km via drums called cambarysus.

References

Further reading
 The Geographical Journal (1898), volume 12, page 64, contains a sample of Bach's vocabulary

Unclassified languages of South America
Extinct languages of South America